Erysimum ammophilum is a species of wallflower known by the common name coast wallflower.

It is endemic to California, where it is an uncommon beach-dwelling wildflower. It is known from dunes and bluffs near Monterey Bay, the coastline of San Diego County, and parts of the Channel Islands.

Description
Erysimum ammophilum is a biennial or perennial plant varying in size from a few centimeters to over half a meter in height. It starts from a patch of long, narrow dark green leaves and produces one to several erect stems lined with similar leaves.

Atop the stem is an array of bright yellow flowers, each with four rounded petals. As the stem grows the flowers drop away to leave developing fruits, which are narrow siliques 2 to 12 centimeters long sticking out from the stem. The fruits contain winged seeds.

See also
California coastal sage and chaparral ecoregion

References

External links
Jepson Manual Treatment for Erysimum ammophilum
USDA Plants Profile
Erysimum ammophilum — Photo gallery

ammophilum
Endemic flora of California
Natural history of the California chaparral and woodlands
Natural history of the Channel Islands of California
Natural history of Monterey County, California
Natural history of San Diego County, California